KHBM (1430 AM) is a radio station licensed to Monticello, Arkansas, United States.  The station is currently owned by Pines Broadcasting.

History 
On April 27, 2007, the station was sold to Pines Broadcasting.

References

External links

HBM